Pam Shriver was the three-time defending champion and won in the final against Larisa Savchenko, 4–6, 6–2, 6–2.

Seeds
The top eight seeds receive a bye into the second round.

  Pam Shriver (champion)
  Lori McNeil (third round)
  Bettina Bunge (second round)
  Catarina Lindqvist (second round)
  Elizabeth Smylie (quarterfinals)
  Sylvia Hanika (second round)
  Carling Bassett (quarterfinals)
  Larisa Savchenko (final)
  Etsuko Inoue (semifinals)
  Terry Phelps (first round)
  Rosalyn Fairbank (quarterfinals)
  Nathalie Tauziat (quarterfinals)
  Catherine Tanvier (second round)
  Jo Durie (first round)

Qualifying

Draw

Finals

Top half

Section 1

Section 2

Bottom half

Section 3

Section 4

External links
 WTA tournament draws
 ITF tournament draws

Dow Chemical Classic - Singles
Singles